Vesela Nikolaeva Lecheva (born May 20, 1964) is a Bulgarian sport shooter and current politician from the Bulgarian Socialist Party (BSP).

Sports career 
She won the Silver medal in the 50 m rifle 3 pos in the 1988 Summer Olympics in Seoul and 10 m air rifle in 1992 Summer Olympics in Barcelona. Lecheva was born in Veliko Tarnovo.

Since 13 November 2000, Lecheva has been a member of the executive bureau of the Bulgarian Olympic Committee. She is married to businessman Manol Velev and they have one child.

Political career 
In 2019, Lecheva was the Bulgarian Socialist Party's candidate for the elections for mayor of Veliko Tarnovo. She lost to Daniel Panov and finished with 22.22%.

In October 2019, Lecheva visited Samovodene to campaign for BSP's candidate Margarita Surmenova for mayor of Samovodene.

She was appointed Youth and Sports Minister to the new Donev government in August 2022.

References

External links
 

1964 births
Living people
Bulgarian female sport shooters
ISSF rifle shooters
Shooters at the 1988 Summer Olympics
Shooters at the 1992 Summer Olympics
Shooters at the 1996 Summer Olympics
Shooters at the 2000 Summer Olympics
Olympic shooters of Bulgaria
Olympic silver medalists for Bulgaria
Olympic medalists in shooting
Medalists at the 1992 Summer Olympics
Medalists at the 1988 Summer Olympics

People from Veliko Tarnovo
21st-century Bulgarian women politicians
21st-century Bulgarian politicians
Bulgarian sportsperson-politicians
Bulgarian Socialist Party politicians
Women government ministers of Bulgaria